The First Minute of a New Day is an album by American vocalist Gil Scott-Heron, keyboardist Brian Jackson, and the Midnight Band—an eight-piece musical ensemble. It was released in January 1975 on Arista Records. Recording sessions for the album took place in the summer of 1974 at D&B Sound in Silver Spring, Maryland. It was the follow-up to Scott-Heron's and Jackson's critically acclaimed collaboration effort Winter in America. The First Minute of a New Day was the first album to feature "Winter in America", the title track of Scott-Heron's previous album which was not featured on its original LP release. The album was reissued on compact disc by Scott-Heron's label Rumal-Gia Records in 1998.

Music and lyrics
The First Minute of a New Day served as Jackson's and Scott-Heron's debut for the Arista label and featured the eight-piece Midnight Band. With the Midnight Band and better financial support from Arista, the album benefited from a larger supporting cast and slicker production, in contrast to the sparse production on Winter in America. The Midnight Band would later be featured on following Scott-Heron albums, assisting in production and back-up instrumentation.

The songs on The First Minute of a New Day, which feature themes ranging from spirituality ("Offering") to revolution ("The Liberation Song") and oppression ("Winter in America"), contain jazz melodies by the Midnight Band and funk influences. "Winter in America" featured themes of struggle and had Scott-Heron singing of social, geographical and environmental oppression. The album's only spoken word cut, also a live take, "Pardon Our Analysis" was a sequel to Winter in America "H2O Gate Blues" as a criticism of President Richard Nixon's pardon, though this time the track did not feature a musical backing of any kind.

Reception

Following the little commercial success experienced by Scott-Heron's previous LPs, the album had multi-chart success, which seemed promising for their new record label. Even though Scott-Heron's previous albums, in specific Pieces of a Man and Winter in America, featured singles, they did not chart. However, no singles were released for The First Minute of a New Day, off the album or for promotion.

Following heavy promotion by Arista, the album entered the Top Jazz Albums chart at number 17 on February 8, 1975. It later peaked at number 5 before falling off the charts on July 19, 1975, 24 weeks after its original appearance. The First Minute of a New Day also peaked at number 8 on the Black Albums chart and number 30 on the Pop Albums chart. While not as critically acclaimed as Jackson's and Scott-Heron's previous effort Winter in America, The First Minute of a New Day gave Scott-Heron wider recognition among fans and critics, due in part to its heavy promotion. Tim Sheridan of Allmusic called it "solid, decidedly left-of-center jazz-R&B" and went on to write:

Music critic Neil Tesser described Scott-Heron's singing voice for the album as "mahogany, sunshine, and tears." The contributions by the Midnight Band were also praised by critics. Robert Christgau of the Village Voice noted that "the free-jazz-gone-populist band generates so much rhythmic energy that it carries over the weak spots".

Track listing
All songs written by Gil Scott-Heron and Brian Jackson, except where noted.

Side one
 "Offering" – 3:34
 "The Liberation Song (Red, Black and Green)" – 6:18
 "Must Be Something" (Jackson, Danny Bowens, Scott-Heron, Bob Adams) – 5:16
 "Ain't No Such Thing As Superman" (Scott-Heron) – 4:13
 "Pardon Our Analysis (We Beg Your Pardon)" – 8:01
Side two
 "Guerilla" (Scott-Heron) – 7:49
 "Winter in America" (Scott-Heron) – 6:09
 "Western Sunrise" (Bilal Sunni Ali) – 5:16
 "Alluswe" – 5:04

Bonus tracks
All bonus cuts for the CD reissue were managed and produced by Malcolm Cecil.
 "A Talk: Bluesology / Black History / Jaws / The Revolution Will Not Be Televised" - Live at The Wax Museum 1982 – 10:41
 "Winter in America" - 1978 Solo Version – 6:26

Charts
Billboard Music Charts (North America) – The First Minute of a New Day
1975: Jazz Albums – #5
1975: Black Albums – #8
1975: Pop Albums – #30

Personnel

Musicians
Gil Scott-Heron – vocals, piano, electric piano, guitar
Brian Jackson – synthesizer, keyboards, flute, vocals
Bilal Sunni Ali – flute, harmonica, saxophone
Danny Bowens – bass
Eddie Knowles - percussion, conga
Barnett Williams - percussion
Victor Brown – percussion, vocals
Charlie Saunders – congas, drums
Bob Adams – drums
Victor Bowens – tambourine, vocals, bells

Additional personnel
Perpis-Fall Music, Inc. – producer
Jose Williams – engineer, production assistance
David Lau – artwork
Vera Savcic, Adam Shore – reissue exec. producer
Malcolm Cecil – remastering, reissue engineer

Notes

References

Gil Scott-Heron albums
1975 albums
Albums produced by Perpis-Fall Music, Inc.
Arista Records albums
Collaborative albums